KZNB (1490 AM) is a radio station that broadcasts in a Regional Mexican format. Licensed to Petaluma, California, it serves the Santa Rosa area. The station is owned by California Broadcasting Company, LLC.

The station's transmitter building and radio tower were featured in the film American Graffiti. The interior "DJ" scenes, featuring Wolfman Jack, were filmed at KRE in Berkeley, California.

On Tuesday, January 10, 1950, at 6 a.m., 1490 kHz commenced broadcasting as KAFP, which stood for 'Krowing Always For Petaluma,' associating the city with its poultry-processing status. Under the original ownership of Harold Sparks and Forrest Hughes, a.k.a. Petaluma Broadcasters, KAFP broadcast a hodgepodge of local and network/syndicated programs such as Sammy Kaye's music show, UP Radio News, a.o. For most of its life, 1490 signed off around midnight, though it was licensed to broadcast 24 hours daily.

KAFP, now owned by Lloyd Burlingham, became KTOB at 6:45 p.m. on January 10, 1961, eleven years after signing on. The format remained relatively the same, with a mix of news, talk, sports and music shows geared toward the Petaluma community.

During its life, KTOB was fraught with financial problems. On September 30, 1963, KTOB was shut down due to bankruptcy, but was resuscitated two weeks later. At that time, October 13, 1963, a gentleman became closely associated with KTOB's mostly-MOR (middle of the road) programming over the next several years, and eventually became a part-owner: Ron Walters.

Local sports broadcasts, church features, and a strong community orientation were hallmarks of KTOB well into the 1980s. Notable air talent in this era included Larry Chiaroni, now a news anchor and reporter for KCBS San Francisco; John Emmett, who later became play-by-play broadcaster for the AAA baseball Richmond Braves; Roger Coryell, longtime San Francisco jazz host and programmer; Ken Korach, who is now the play-by-play announcer for the Oakland Athletics; and Alan Stock, a nationally known radio talk show host at KXNT in Las Vegas.

KTOB changed its call sign to the current KZNB on November 14, 2014.

External links

Mass media in Sonoma County, California
ZNB
Petaluma, California
ZNB
Radio stations established in 1950
1950 establishments in California